Telhara (formerly known as Telāḍhaka) was a Buddhist monastic establishment in Nalanda district of Bihar, India dating back to the 1st-century CE and active till at least the 12th-century CE.
It is notable as it has been mentioned in the travelogues of Chinese monks including Xuanzang.

History
It has been mentioned as Teladhaka in the writings of the Chinese traveller Hiuen Tsang, who visited the place in the 7th century CE. It is mentioned in an inscription found at Nālandā which mentions a temple restored a man named Bālāditya, a Jyāvisa of Telāḍhaka who had emigrated from Kauśāmbī, in the eleventh year of Mahipala Deva. 

It has been also mentioned in the Ain-i-Akbari as Tiladah, and is shown as one of the 46 mahals (administrative units) of the Bihar sarkar. Telhara was shown as a pargana in the maps prepared by the East India Company administration during 1842–45.

The ruins of Telhara were mentioned in an 1872 letter by A. M. Broadley, the then Magistrate of Nalanda. Broadley noted that a large number of stone and metal images were often found during the digging of graves at the top of one of the mounds.  Metal images found were melted down. The State Government of Bihar started a new archaeological excavation of the site in December 2009. The work unearthed ancient pottery, antiques, and the remains of a three-storeyed structure mentioned by Hiuen Tsang. Evidence of prayer halls and residential cells in the monastery have been found. The excavation revealed the following chronological layers:

 Northern Black Polished Ware (3rd Century BCE)
 Kushan (1st century CE)
 Gupta (5th to 7th century CE)
 Pala (7th century to 11th century CE)

A number of sculptures from the site had been moved to museums during the British Raj. The Indian Museum in Kolkata houses the Maitreya and the twelve-armed Avalokiteswar images from Telhara. A Pala sculpture from the site is present at the Rietberg Museum in Zurich. Telhara has a mosque, which is said to have been built with the materials carried from the ruins of the Buddhist monastery. One pillar contained an inscription that mentions the place-name Telāḍhaka.

Remains of an ancient university (Mahavihara) on the site were unearthed in 2014.

A small museum named Baladitya Museum has been established to store some of the artifacts found.

References

Buddhist sites in Bihar
Defunct Buddhist monasteries